Leslie Hulme (9 January 1933 – 29 July 2016), known professionally as Ken Barrie, was an English voice actor and singer. He was best known for singing the theme tune of the BBC television programmes Hi-de-Hi!, Postman Pat and Charlie Chalk, and also narrated the latter two. He was also known for providing the voices of several of the series' characters.

Biography
Barrie was born on 9 January 1933 in Tunstall, Stoke on Trent, Staffordshire. Under the stage name Les Carle, he recorded for Embassy Records, an offshoot of Woolworths that released inexpensive cover versions of pop hits, between 1962 and 1965. He changed his stage name when a friend told him it was French for "the Charlies", and took his new name of Ken Barrie from the names of his wife's brothers.

His own singing and narrating voice and whistling has been heard in many movies and television commercials, and included providing the voices of the Smash Martians.  Barrie provided singing voices in feature films for many actors, including Larry Hagman, George C. Scott, and Horst Buchholz.

He became the voice of Postman Pat in 1981, narrating the first and second series and also providing the voices of the characters Postman Pat, Ted Glen, Granny Dryden, Peter Fogg, Major Forbes, George Lancaster, Jeff Pringle, Alf Thompson, Reverend Timms, Arthur Selby, and Sam Waldron.

He retired from voicing Pat in 2008 when the series was revamped as Postman Pat Special Delivery Service, though stayed on as the voice of Ted Glen, Alf Thompson, P.C. Selby and Reverend Timms for the show's first series. A single of the theme song, credited to Barrie, reached number 44 on the UK Singles Chart in 1982, and re entered the chart the following year.

He also sang the soundtrack for Charlie Chalk and recorded the soundtracks for Sharks' Treasure, Emily and Silent Scream. He also whistled the tune for the theme song of the 1987 BBC series My Family and Other Animals, based on the book by zoologist Gerald Durrell and sang the theme song to the hit long running BBC sitcom Hi-de-Hi! He died at his home in Denham, Buckinghamshire, on 29 July 2016 from liver cancer.

References

External links

1933 births
2016 deaths
Deaths from cancer in England
Deaths from liver cancer
English male voice actors
English male singers
People from Tunstall, Staffordshire